Sir William Ivor Jennings  (16 May 1903 – 19 December 1965) was a British lawyer and academic. He  served as the vice chancellor of the University of Cambridge (1961–63) and the University of Ceylon (1942–55).

Education
Jennings was educated at Queen Elizabeth's Hospital, Bristol (a boarding school), at Bristol Grammar School, and at St Catharine's College, Cambridge.

Career
Jennings joined the University of Leeds as a lecturer in law in 1925 and became a Holt Scholar of Gray's Inn and was called to the bar in 1928. The following year he joined the London School of Economics as lecturer in law.

Jennings was sent to Ceylon by the British Government in 1942, as the Principal of the University College, Colombo with a mandate to create a university for that land, then a Crown colony. The institution, on the model of University of London, was dubbed the University of Ceylon and was first established in Colombo, the capital city, then partially transferred in 1952 to a purpose-built campus in Peradeniya. During World War II he served as the Deputy Civil Defense Commissioner.

He was knighted in 1948, made a King's Counsel in 1949, and awarded the KBE in 1955. In 1955, Jennings received an honorary doctorate by vote of the senate of the University of Ceylon to recognize his work in creating and building the institution. A hall of residence at the University of Peradeniya is named in his honour.

In the same year (1955) he returned to Britain to take up the post of Master of Trinity Hall, Cambridge. He subsequently served a term as Vice-Chancellor of the University of Cambridge, a position which at that time rotated among the heads of the colleges.

Jennings married Helen Emily Konsalik in 1928 and had two daughters, Shirley (Jennings) Watson and Claire (Jennings) Dewing. Together with his wife and daughter Claire, he was aboard the MS Lakonia, a Greek-owned cruise ship, when it caught fire and sank north of Madeira on 22 December 1963, with the loss of 128 lives.

Constitutional law

Jennings was an authority on constitutional law and is author of a definitive book on the workings of the then British constitution. He advised D. S. Senanayake in drafting the Constitution of Ceylon to form the Dominion of Ceylon.

He was proposed by Indian nationalist leader Jawaharlal Nehru to be the chairman of the drafting committee of the Constitution of India; however, eventually Mahatma Gandhi's candidate, B. R. Ambedkar, was chosen. He then served as constitutional adviser to the Government of Pakistan.

He was a member of the Reid Commission from June 1956 to 1957, which was responsible for drafting the Constitution of the Federation of Malaya (now Malaysia).

In 1959, he was an advisor to the committee to draft the constitution of Nepal, which was named " Constitution of the Kingdom of Nepal,1959."

Partial bibliography
The Road to Peradeniya
Constitutional Laws of the British Empire (1938), later reissued as Constitutional Laws of the Commonwealth (1957)
Parliament (1939)
A Federation for Western Europe (1940)
Party Politics (1955)
The Approach to Self-Government
The Law and the Constitution (5th Edition) (1959)
Principles of Local Government Law (4th Edition) (1960)
The British Commonwealth of Nations (1st Ed. 1948, 2nd Ed. 1954, 3rd. Ed. 1956, 4th Revised Ed. 1961)
Cabinet Government (3rd Edition) (1965)
The British Constitution (5th Edition) (1966)

See also
University of Ceylon
List of Vice-Chancellors of the University of Cambridge

References

External links
Sir Ivor: First Vice Chancellor of University of Ceylon
Archives of Sir Ivor Jennings

1903 births
1965 deaths
English constitutionalists
Ceylonese Knights Bachelor
Knights Commander of the Order of the British Empire
Masters of Trinity Hall, Cambridge
Members of Gray's Inn
People associated with the Ceylon University College
People educated at Bristol Grammar School
People educated at Queen Elizabeth's Hospital, Bristol
People from British Ceylon
Sri Lankan people of English descent
Vice-Chancellors of the University of Cambridge
Vice-Chancellors of the University of Ceylon
Downing Professors of the Laws of England
Alumni of St Catharine's College, Cambridge
Academics of the University of Leeds
Academics of the London School of Economics
20th-century King's Counsel
20th-century English historians
20th-century British lawyers
Fellows of the British Academy